Route 277 is a collector road in the Canadian province of Nova Scotia.

It is located in the central part of the province and runs from Lantz at Trunk 2 to Gays River at Route 224.

Communities
Lantz
Dutch Settlement
Carroll's Corner
Gays River

See also
List of Nova Scotia provincial highways

References

Roads in Colchester County
Roads in Hants County, Nova Scotia
Roads in Halifax, Nova Scotia
Nova Scotia provincial highways